Sabrina Poulin (born 3 October 1992) is a Canadian rugby union player.

Poulin competed for the Canadian sevens team at the 2021 Canada Women's Sevens in Vancouver and Edmonton. In 2022, She was named in Canada's fifteens's team for the delayed 2021 Rugby World Cup in New Zealand.

References 

Living people
1992 births
Female rugby union players
Canadian female rugby union players
Canada women's international rugby union players